Anthony Thomas Stover (born June 1, 1990) is an American professional basketball player.

He competed for two seasons at UCLA before his dismissal from the program. Stover has played in multiple leagues during his pro career, including the NBA D-League.

Early life and career 
Stover was born on June 1, 1990, in Pasadena, California to Craig and Rena Stover. His father played basketball collegiately for Pepperdine University and Stover's younger brother, Nick, played for South Alabama. He first attended Renaissance Academy near his hometown, averaging 10.6 points, 6.8 rebounds and 7.4 blocks per game as a junior. Stover then moved to Windward School in Los Angeles, where he played basketball and volleyball. He won the California Interscholastic Federation (CIF) Division V basketball title as a senior in 2009. In his final season, he earned all-state honors and averaged 14.0 points, 11.0 rebounds and 9.5 blocks per game. Stover left Windward as California's second-best center, as stated by Rivals.com. ESPN rated him the 33rd-best center of his class. He was ranked a four-star recruit by Scout.com and 247Sports.com.

College career
Stover played two years in college for UCLA. He was negatively profiled in a February 2012 Sports Illustrated article, which stated that he partnered with Reeves Nelson to erode team unity as a freshman and did not take practices seriously, often shooting free throws one handed or fading away. As a sophomore, he posted averages of 0.5 points and 1.5 rebounds in 28 games, recording 8.4 minutes per contest. His 1.4 blocks per game were a team high. In August 2012, he was dismissed from the team for failing to meet eligibility requirements. Coach Ben Howland said in a statement. "We are very disappointed that Anthony has not met his academic requirements. We had high expectations for him, and we were looking forward to getting increased contributions from him during this coming season."

Professional career
After departing UCLA, Stover joined the Los Angeles D-Fenders of the NBA D-League and subsequently played for a Japanese squad. In 2015, Stover played for the Rochester Razorsharks in the Premier Basketball League, helping the team to a 17–0 record and league title.

Although he could have made more money elsewhere, Stover signed with the Saint John Mill Rats of the National Basketball League of Canada (NBL) due to the possibility of winning a championship.  Stover was named NBL Canada Player of the Week on February 7, 2016, after averaging 13 rebounds and six blocked shots in three games for the Mill Rats. At the end of the season he was named Defensive Player of the Year after setting a league single season record with 132 blocks. On October 6, 2016, Stover re-signed with the Mill Rats, since renamed the Saint John Riptide, for the following season.

On January 17, 2018 Stover was traded by the Riptide to the Niagara River Lions in exchange for a 1st-round pick in the 2018 NBLC Draft.

Stover failed to make an appearance for Niagara before being traded again on February 20, 2018 to the St. John's Edge for future considerations.

On September 12, 2018, Stover signed with the Halifax Hurricanes of the NBL Canada.

On September 10th 2019, Stover signed with APOP Paphos B.C. in the Cyprus Federation first division.

References 

1990 births
Living people
American expatriate basketball people in Canada
American expatriate basketball people in Japan
Basketball players from Pasadena, California
UCLA Bruins men's basketball players
Los Angeles D-Fenders players
Saint John Mill Rats players
Saint John Riptide players
Tokyo Cinq Rêves players
St. John's Edge players
Halifax Hurricanes players
American men's basketball players
Centers (basketball)
Power forwards (basketball)